Lin Shengben (born 1927) is a Chinese hymn composer, known for his songs composed with Chinese traditional tunes.

Life 
Lin lost his mom and dad at the ages of 8 and 10 respectively. Due to the Sino-Japanese War, his childhood was spent in the forest fleeing the Japanese army. He began his theological education at Alliance Bible Institute (now Alliance Bible Seminary in Hong Kong) at Wuzhou, Guangxi in 1945. Two years later, he was enrolled to Leung Kwong Baptist Seminary (now the Hong Kong Baptist Theological Seminary) and, at the age of 23, he started studying church music at China Baptist Theological Seminary, Shanghai, supervised under Ma Geshun (1914–2015), a professor at the Shanghai Conservatory of Music and one of the most significant choral conductors in twentieth-century China. He then studied theology and sacred music at Nanjing Theological Seminary in 1952 for two years.

He was a pastor of Jingling Church, Shanghai (formerly known as Jinglin Church []) from 1980 until his retirement in 2002.

As one of the four editors of the Chinese New Hymnal, some of his works were compiled to this hymnal, which is still widely used in the Three-Self churches in China. One of his most famous hymns, Winter is Past (Chinese: 與主同去歌), was co-written with the Chinese theologian Wang Weifan.

Works

See also 

 Chinese New Hymnal

References

External links 
 An Interview by Hong Kong Church Music Association

Living people
1927 births
Chinese Protestants
Chinese Protestant ministers and clergy
Chinese hymnwriters